This is a list of members of the Victorian Legislative Council between 1992 and 1996. As half of the Legislative Council's terms expired at each periodic election, half of these members were elected at the 1988 state election with terms expiring in 1996, while the other half were elected at the 1992 state election with terms intended to expire in 2000, but which lapsed at the 1999 state election.

 Bill Landeryou, Labor MLC for Doutta Galla Province, resigned in December 1992. Labor candidate John Brumby won the resulting by-election on 20 February 1993. However, in June, Brumby was elected leader of the Labor Party, forcing his resignation from the Legislative Council on 10 August 1993 in order to contest a by-election in the Legislative Assembly. Labor candidate Monica Gould won the resulting by-election on 18 September.

Sourcesnu
 Re-member (a database of all Victorian MPs since 1851). Parliament of Victoria.

Members of the Parliament of Victoria by term
20th-century Australian politicians